"Stay the Same" is the debut solo single by American singer Joey McIntyre, released in March 1999 from his debut solo album Stay the Same. It peaked at No. 10 on the Billboard Hot 100 and was certified gold by the RIAA. The song is McIntyre's most successful single.

Music video
Directed by Rocky Schenck, the video begins with McIntyre (along with a gospel choir) recording the song in a recording studio. It later cuts to scenes of McIntyre singing on the Belmont Ave. pedestrian bridge over the 101 freeway near Silver Lake and Echo Park in Downtown Los Angeles, in a tree while looking over the said highway and on the roof of a house. McIntyre also sees a birthday being held while singing from afar.

Track listings
 European & Australian CD maxi-single
 "Stay the Same" - 3:48
 "Stay the Same"  (Tony Moran Radio Remix)  - 4:39
 "Stay the Same"  (Tony Moran Extended Club Remix)- 9:38 	
 "Stay the Same"  (Tony Moran Extended Club Remix Instrumental)  - 9:41

 European CD Single
 "Stay the Same" - 3:48
 "Stay the Same" (Tony Moran Radio Remix) - 4:34

 US CD & Cassette Single 
 "Stay the Same" - 3:48
 "Couldn't Stay Away From Your Love" (Excerpt) - 1:12
 "The Way" (Excerpt) - 1:11
 "I Can't Do It Without You" (Excerpt) - 1:16

Charts and certifications

Weekly charts

End of year charts

Certifications

|}

References

External links
Music video on YouTube

1999 debut singles
Music videos directed by Rocky Schenck
1999 songs
Columbia Records singles
Song recordings produced by Walter Afanasieff
Pop ballads